The Ayyalon Cave is a large limestone cave near Ramla, Israel in which new species of crustaceans were discovered in April 2006. It has been studied for its complex food web, which survived for millions of years without light or organic food coming in from the surface, being based solely on a type of bacterium which feeds on sulfur which serves as the only organic matter available for the next higher level of organisms to feed on. The cave has offered an ecological refuge for species whose relatives living at the surface have been wiped out by climatic changes and catastrophic events over millions of years, and offers a unique sample for the study of long-term ecological changes in the area.

The cave is not accessible to the public. Only a small number of researchers are allowed to enter.

Name
In scientific literature the cave is known as the Ayyalon Cave. In the press it might be spelled as "Ayalon Cave", and has also been dubbed "the Noah's Ark cave", as it offered animal species a survival niche and it is located in the "land of the Bible".

History
The cave was discovered in 2006 when a small opening was discerned in a quarry near Ramla.

Description
According to Professor Amos Frumkin of the Hebrew University, the cave is unique in that a thick layer of chalk left it impermeable to any water coming from the surface.

Ecosystem

Photosynthesis-free food chain
As the cave was completely cut off from the outside environment, it sustained an independent ecosystem; this ecosystem relied for an energy source neither on sunlight and photosynthesis, nor on an external source of organic compounds. Rather, energy was extracted by chemoautotrophic bacteria, living in a film on top of the water of an underground lake. These bacteria produce energy by oxidizing the sulfide compounds in the water, and derive organic compounds using carbon dioxide from the air. These compounds form the basis of the cave's ecosystem. The temperature and salt content of the cave's water indicates that it originates from sources deep underground. Although this cave is part of an aquifer fed by rain falling in the mountains to the east, which happens to be one of the main potable water sources for Israel and the Palestinian territories, chemically more complex sources can create local pockets with very specific water composition.

New species
Researchers announced that they have so far discovered eight species previously unknown to science, all without eyes, comprising four aquatic crustacean species and four other species of terrestrial crustaceans and springtails. They added that the crustaceans included two seawater and two fresh water species, this diversity giving hope that it might help better understand the water history of the region.

Unfortunately, a species of eyeless troglobitic scorpion representing a taxonomic family previously unknown to science, has been discovered only a decade or so after its extinction. This was probably caused by overpumping of the ground water, which has led the underground lake to shrink, and with it the food supply to dwindle. The ten specimen found dead in the cave are exceptionally well preserved and allowed the conclusion that they used a motion detecting organ situated on their abdomen for orientation. The species was given the name Akrav israchanani, from the Hebrew word for scorpion, "akrav", and honouring the researchers who identified it, Israel Naaman and Hanan Dimentman.

See also
Typhlocaris galilea, a cave-dwelling blind shrimp and relative of one of the Ayyalon Cave species, found only in a spring near the Sea of Galilee in Israel 
Movile Cave
Geography of Israel
Wildlife of Israel

References

External links

National Geographic

Caves of Israel
Limestone caves
Ramla